Zohaib Asghar is a Pakistani actor. He rose to prominence after mark his debut in film by playing the role of Tambi in critical and internationally acclaim 2013 Pakistani film Zinda Bhaag, for which he was nominated as Best Actor in a Comic Role at 1st ARY Film Awards.

Career
Zohaib Asghar has no background in acting, prior to showbiz, Asghar was a  mobile accessories dealer. He auditioned for film in Lahore auditions, and got selected for one of three lead roles in film alongside Khurram Patras and Salman Ahmed Khan, who were also non-actors prior to auditions.

Filmography

References

External links 
 
 

Living people
Pakistani male film actors
Pakistani male television actors
Male actors from Lahore
Year of birth missing (living people)